The term Chinese leopard refers to any of the following three leopard (Panthera pardus) subspecies occurring in China:
Indian leopard (P. p. fusca) in southern Tibet, where leopards have been recorded in Qomolangma National Nature Preserve.
Amur leopard (P. p. orientalis) in Jilin Province of northern China, where it has been recorded by camera-traps in Hunchun National Nature Reserve. Leopards cross between China, Russia  and North Korea across the Tumen River despite a high and long wire fence marking the international boundary.
Indochinese leopard (P. p. delacouri) in Yunnan Province of southern China, where the Pearl River is thought to form a barrier to leopard populations farther north.

References

Leopards